Antonino Saviano (born 7 January 1984) is a former Italian footballer.

Biography

Reggina
Born in Reggio Calabria, Calabria, Saviano played 2 seasons in Serie D (top of non-professional leagues) before joining  Napoli Soccer in mid-2004, a newly formed phoenix club of S.S.C. Napoli.

On 1 July 2005 he returned to his parent club Reggina and made his Serie A debut on March 5, 2006. That match Ivan Pelizzoli was not played and Nicola Pavarini was injured in the first half. That match Reggina won Treviso 1–0.

On 7 May 2006 (round 37), Saviano played his second (and the last) Serie A match, replacing Pelizzoli in the 55th minute. He concerned 2 more goals, made the club once losing 0–5. Eventually Nicola Amoruso scored to goal for Reggina, made the final scored fixed at losing to Fiorentina 2–5.

Chievo
On 1 July 2006 he was signed by fellow Serie A club Chievo on a free transfer. However, he was farmed to Serie C2 club Cassino, on a co-ownership deal.

In mid-2007, he was farmed to Sansovino from Chievo, along with defenders Marcus N'Ze, Leonardo Moracci, midfielders Maycol Andriani, Luca Spinetti and forward Xhulian Rrudho. Except Moracci, they joined the Serie C2 club on co-ownership deals.

In June 2008, Chievo gave the remaining 50% registration rights of Sansovino to Cassino. However, he soon retired from professional football.

References

External links
 
 Lega Calcio Profile 

Italian footballers
Serie A players
Reggina 1914 players
S.S.C. Napoli players
F.C. Matera players
A.S.D. Cassino Calcio 1924 players
A.C. Sansovino players
Association football goalkeepers
Sportspeople from Reggio Calabria
1984 births
Living people
Footballers from Calabria